Battarrea griffithsii is a species of mushroom in the family Agaricaceae.

Taxonomy 
Battarrea griffithsii was first described by V.S. White in a 1901 Bulletin of the Torrey Botanical Club.

Description

References

External links 
 Mycobank General Information

Agaricaceae